Acratodes suavata is a species of geometrid moth in the family Geometridae. It is found in the Caribbean Sea and North America.

The MONA or Hodges number for Acratodes suavata is 7148.

References

Further reading

 
 

Timandrini
Articles created by Qbugbot
Moths described in 1900